Morón Municipal Museum is a museum located in Morón, Cuba. It was established on 30 November 1981.

The museum holds collections on history, weaponry, archeology and ethnology.

See also 
 List of museums in Cuba

References 

Museums in Cuba
Buildings and structures in Ciego de Ávila Province
Museum
Museums established in 1981
1981 establishments in Cuba
20th-century architecture in Cuba